Sherwin Tjia is a Canadian artist, and medical illustrator.

He is the author of several graphic novels.  His latest Plummet was listed on the CBC's list of recommended winter reads, for 2020.

According to The Globe and Mail, in 2010, Tija was known as the creator of Toronto's strip spelling bee scene.  In strip spelling bees players who spell words wrong have to start removing some of their music, accompanied by burlesque strip-tease music.  In 2014 the New York Daily News described how Tija introduced porn karaoke to the New York area.  In porn karaoke small teams have to improvise dialogue sung over silent clips of pornography.

The premise of Plummet is that his protagonist is in a constant state of freefall.

Publications

References

Artists from Toronto
Canadian graphic novelists
Canadian illustrators
Living people
People from Scarborough, Toronto
Year of birth missing (living people)